A Judas goat is a goat used to lead sheep or cattle to a specific destination, sometimes to slaughter.

Judas goat or Judas Goat may also refer to:
 Assembly ship, also known as a Judas goat, a bomber aircraft used by the U.S. Air Force in World War II to lead formations
 The Judas Goat, a 1978 Spenser novel by Robert B. Parker
 "The Judas Goat", a 2017 episode from season 1 of TV series The Punisher